The 2021 Turkish Super Cup (Turkish: TFF Süper Kupa) or 2021 Turkcell Super Cup for sponsorship reasons, was the 48th edition of the Turkish Super Cup since its establishment as Presidential Cup in 1966, the annual Turkish football match contested by the winners of the previous season's top league and cup competitions (or cup runner-up in case the league- and cup-winning club is the same). The game was played on 5 January 2022 between Beşiktaş and Antalyaspor.  The venue was the Ahmed bin Ali Stadium in Doha, Qatar. Beşiktaş won the match 4–2 on penalties.

Teams

Match

Details

Notes

References

 

2021
Super Cup
Beşiktaş J.K. matches
Antalyaspor matches
Sports competitions in Doha
Turkish Super Cup
Turkish Super Cup 2021